Don't Let Me Know may refer to:

"Don't Let Me Know", song by the Joy Formidable from Hitch
"Don't Let Me Know", song by Lucie Silvas
"Don't Let Me Know", song by Cyrus